A referendum on copyright was held in Switzerland on 19 March 1905. Voters were asked whether they approved of a federal resolution on revising article 64 of the constitution, defining the protection rights of inventors. It was approved by 70.4% of voters and a majority of cantons.

Background
The referendum was a mandatory referendum, which required a double majority; a majority of the popular vote and majority of the cantons. The decision of each canton was based on the vote in that canton. Full cantons counted as one vote, whilst half cantons counted as half.

Results

References

1905 referendums
1905 in Switzerland
Referendums in Switzerland